Quo Vadis is an action-adventure game designed by Steven T. Chapman for the Commodore 64 and released by  The Edge in 1984.

Gameplay
The object of the game is to explore a vast set of caverns and retrieve a scepter. Along the way the player must avoid (or shoot) various monsters and lava pits.

The playing area of the game extends over 1024 screen sizes, making it the largest arcade adventure/platform game of the time. A map of the playing area was published in the October 1984 issue of the magazine Personal Computer Games. Various "riddles" are hidden throughout the caverns. When the game was first released the publishers offered a prize to the first person who could complete the game and find and correctly answer all the riddles.

The prize, a gold scepter valued at £10,000, was apparently never claimed. Some people did mail answers in but were told they had answered the riddles incorrectly.  There is a common understanding the solution must have been "Honi soit qui mal y pense", which was mailed in by several gamers, but the publisher never had the intention to pay the price in the first place, and therefor never released the "official" correct answer either.

Reception
Quo Vadis received the Game of the Month award in the September 1984 issue of the UK magazine Personal Computer Games.

References

1984 video games
Action-adventure games
Commodore 64 games
Commodore 64-only games
Video games developed in the United Kingdom